Michael Ruru (born 3 December 1990) is a New Zealand rugby union player who plays for Bayonne in the French Top 14, having previously played for the  in Super Rugby. He is the older brother of Auckland Blues scrum half Jonathan Ruru.

Super Rugby Statistics

References

1990 births
Living people
New Zealand rugby union players
New Zealand expatriates in Australia
Rugby union scrum-halves
Hawke's Bay rugby union players
Perth Spirit players
Western Force players
New Zealand expatriate rugby union players
Expatriate rugby union players in Australia
Melbourne Rebels players
Melbourne Rising players
Expatriate rugby union players in France
Aviron Bayonnais players
Rugby union players from Napier, New Zealand